Erycia is a genus of flies in the family Tachinidae.

Species
E. fasciata Villeneuve, 1924
E. fatua (Meigen, 1824)
E. festinans (Meigen, 1824)
E. furibunda (Zetterstedt, 1844)

References

Diptera of Europe
Diptera of Asia
Exoristinae
Tachinidae genera
Taxa named by Jean-Baptiste Robineau-Desvoidy